Eta Hydrae (η Hydrae) is a star in the equatorial constellation of Hydra. With an apparent visual magnitude of 4.3, it is visible to the naked eye. However, it is the faintest of the five stars that form the "head" of the hydra. Based upon an annual parallax shift of 5.56 mas, it is located roughly 590 light years from the Sun.

This is a B-type main sequence star with a stellar classification of B3V. It has been classified as a candidate Beta Cephei variable with a period of 2.2 days, although this designation was rejected by Stankov and Handler (2005). The spectrum shows a slight underabundance of carbon, compared to the Sun. The star is around 32 million years old and is spinning with a projected rotational velocity of 101 km/s. It has an estimated seven times the mass of the Sun and nearly four times the Sun's radius. Eta Hydrae radiates 2,680 times the solar luminosity from its outer atmosphere at an effective temperature of 18,630 K.

Name and etymology
This star, along with δ Hya (Lisan al Sudja), ε Hya, ζ Hya, ρ Hya and σ Hya (Minchir), were Ulug Beg's Min al Azʽal, "Belonging to the Uninhabited Spot". According to the catalogue of stars in the Technical Memorandum 33-507 - A Reduced Star Catalog Containing 537 Named Stars, Min al Azʽal or Minazal were the title for five stars:δ Hya as Minazal I, η Hya as Minazal II, ε Hya as Minazal III, ρ Hya as Minazal IV and ζ Hya as Minazal V (exclude σ Hya).

The people of Groote Eylandt called Unwala, "The Crab", for the star cluster including this star, δ Hya (Lisan al Sudja), ε Hya, ζ Hya, ρ Hya and σ Hya (Minchir).

References

B-type main-sequence stars
Beta Cephei variables
Hydra (constellation)
Hydrae, Eta
Durchmusterung objects
Hydrae, 07
074280
042799
3454
Minazal II